The CHCH Television Tower is a 357.5 metre 1,173 feet-high guyed TV mast located at 481 First Road West in Stoney Creek, Ontario, Canada.  The tower houses the primary transmitter for the independent television station CHCH-DT as well as that of CITS-DT, the flagship of the religious Yes TV television system.  It is currently the fourth-tallest structure in Canada.

When completed in 1960, the CHCH Television Tower became the tallest structure in Canada. Only five structures built since then have surpassed its height: the CN Tower in Toronto (completed in 1976), the Cape Race LORAN-C transmitter (completed in 1963, collapsed in 1993), the Inco Superstack in Sudbury (completed in 1971) and the original and replacement guyed mast(s) of the CKX-TV Tower (completed in 1973, collapsed in 1983, rebuilt in 1985). The CHCH tower ranks thirteenth in height among the tallest structures in the Commonwealth of Nations.

The mast is located on the edge of the Niagara Escarpment, so when viewed from the bottom of the escarpment with an elevation some 100+ meters or 300+ feet lower, it appears to be exceptionally tall.

Images

See also
List of tallest structures in Canada
List of masts

External links
 Drawings of CHCH Television Tower - SkyscraperPage.com
 CHCH Television Tower - HD - YouTube

Buildings and structures in Hamilton, Ontario
Transmitter sites in Canada
1960 establishments in Ontario
Towers completed in 1960